The 12th Cuirassier Regiment  was an armoured cavalry (tank) regiment of the French Army. It was the armoured component of the 2nd Armoured Brigade.

History
The Chief of Staff of the French Army decided on 1 September 1990 to create a new experimental armoured regiment of 80 tanks with two squadron groups (Groupes d’Escadrons, GE). Each group would consist of three combat squadrons and one command and logistics squadron.

The 6e-12e RC was formed in 1994 by merging the 6th Cuirassiers Regiment (Roi Cavalerie) and the 12th Cuirassiers Regiment (Dauphin Cavalerie). It retained this unified structure after the 2nd Armoured Division downsized to a brigade-level command.

It participated in overseas operations in Kosovo, Côte d'Ivoire, Senegal, Chad, Afghanistan and Lebanon.

On 1 August 2009 the unified regiment was disbanded with the deactivation of the 6th Cuirassiers. The 12th Cuirassier Regiment continues in existence.

Organization
The regiment was composed of around 1200 personnel organization into 13 squadrons.

EAS - Administration and Support Squadron
6e Cuirassier Groupe d’Escadron (6e CGE) - 6th Cuirassier Squadron Group (x40 MBTs)
ECL - Command and Logistics Squadron
1e Esq - 1st Squadron
2e Esq - 2nd Squadron
3e Esq - 3rd Squadron
12e Cuirassier Groupe d’Escadron (12e CGE) 12th Cuirassier Squadron Group (x40 MBTs)
ECL - Command and Logistics Squadron
1e Esq - 1st Squadron
2e Esq - 2nd Squadron
3e Esq - 3rd Squadron
EEI - Reconnaissance Squadron
EMR - Regimental Maintenance Squadron
5e Esq - 5th Reserve Squadron
6e Esq - 6th Reserve Squadron

References

21st-century regiments of France
Armoured regiments of France
Military units and formations established in 1994
Military units and formations disestablished in 2009